Thanasis Intzoglou (22 August 1945 – 25 July 2020) was a Greek footballer who played as a forward.

Club career
Intzoglou played at the youth level with Chalkidona. In 1962, he played in the Alpha Ethniki with Panionios, and was the league's top goal scorer for the 1967–68 season. He assisted in securing the 1971 Balkans Cup for Panionios by defeating Besa Kavajë. Throughout his tenure with Panionios he featured in the 1969–70 Inter-Cities Fairs Cup, and the 1971–72 UEFA Cup. In the summer of 1974 he played abroad in the National Soccer League with Toronto Homer, and he returned for 1975 season. 

In 1976, he signed with Ethnikos Piraeus, and became the top goal scorer in the league for the second time during the 1976–77 season. He returned for the third time to play with Toronto (renamed as Toronto Panhellenic) for the 1978 summer season. He concluded his career at Korinthos in Beta Ethniki, where he assisted in securing promotion by winning the league title.

International career
Intzoglou played with Greece in 1969, and made four appearances.

Personal life
Intzoglou's brothers Babis and Christos were also footballers, as well as his nephew Lefteris. He died on July 25, 2020.

References

1945 births
2020 deaths
Greece international footballers
Chalkidona F.C. players
Panionios F.C. players
Ethnikos Piraeus F.C. players
Korinthos F.C. players
Super League Greece players
Football League (Greece) players
Canadian National Soccer League players
Association football forwards
Footballers from Piraeus
Greek expatriate footballers
Expatriate soccer players in Canada
Greek expatriate sportspeople in Canada
Greek footballers